Gilbert was an Irish priest in the early Thirteenth century: the first recorded Archdeacon of Lismore.

References

13th-century Irish Roman Catholic priests
Archdeacons of Lismore